Miss Spider's Sunny Patch Friends, sometimes shortened to Sunny Patch, is a Canadian CGI-animated children's television series produced by Nelvana in association with AbsoluteDigital Pictures and Callaway Arts & Entertainment as a follow-up to Miss Spider's Sunny Patch Kids. It was based on the children's books by David Kirk. In Canada, the series aired on Teletoon. 44 episodes were produced.

Premise
The series is set in "Sunny Patch" (a tiny town made of common forest items), populated by anthropomorphic bugs, and primarily centers around the Spider family. The episodes follow the children's adventures playing in Sunny Patch and learning life lessons, such as being kind to others, being imaginative, having responsibility, and being curious about the world around them.

Episodes

Characters

Main
 Miss Spider (voiced by Kristin Davis in the US version and Maria Darling in the UK version) is an adoptee, adopted by Betty Beetle when her biological mother was not found. Miss Spider tries to be a kind and caring mom and give equal time to all of her many children. She strongly believes that "We have to be good to bugs; all bugs."
 Squirt (voiced by Scott Beaudin in the US version and Joanna Ruiz in the UK version) is a curious and adventurous green spider who is 9 years old. Squirt is considered to be the leader of the children and as such, more stories center around him than any other. He enjoys surfing the air on his webs, dreams of flying like Shimmer or Dragon, and is often ready to take the lead in an adventure. Because of his impulsive and curious personality, he often needs the advice of his parents to help him with situations.
 Shimmer (voiced by Rebecca Brenner in the US version and Maria Darling in the UK version) is a pink jewel beetle with an interest in sports and games who is 8 years old. Shimmer is different from the rest of the family as she has abilities the others do not (such as heat sensors). She is one of Miss Spider and Holley's adoptive children.
 Dragon (voiced by Mitchell Eisner in the US version and Maria Darling in the UK version) is a purple dragonfly who is one of Miss Spider and Holley's adoptive children and is 9 years old. He is the eldest of the Spider children and often antagonistic towards others, especially Squirt. In several episodes, Dragon serves as an example of peer pressure. For example, in "Cry Buggie", Dragon pokes fun at Squirt when he explains his feelings.
 Bounce (voiced by Julie Lemieux in the US version and Joanna Ruiz in the UK version) is a blue bedbug who is one of Miss Spider and Holley's adoptive children and is 7 years old. He is a two-legged, high-energy bug and the only bug character in the series to have teeth. He and Dragon have been "best bug buddies" ever since they met because of their similar experiences regarding their original families.

Supporting
 Holley (voiced by Robert Smith in the US version and David Holt in the UK version) is Miss Spider's husband who wears eyeglasses. Holley is a musician who loves to play the guitar. He has a special thinking stone where he makes decisions.
 Spinner (voiced by Austin Di Iulio in Seasons 1-2, Cameron Ansell in Season 3 in the US version and Lynn Cleckner in the UK version) is a yellow spider sporting very large eyeglasses who is 6 years old. He looks almost exactly like his father, Holley. He is a smart and wise bug often looked to for advice. While he is not great at physical activities, he has a wonderful talent for the "bugpipes".
 Pansy (voiced by Aaryn Doyle in the US version and Maria Darling in the UK version) and Snowdrop (voiced by Alexandra Lai in the US version and Lynn Cleckner in the UK version) are orange spiders who are identical twins and they're 6 years old. Their only distinguishing features are different colored bows on their head; Pansy wears a pink bow, while Snowdrop wears a green bow. Pansy sings well, but not as naturally as Snowdrop.
 Wiggle (voiced by Marc McMulkin in the US version and Lynn Cleckner in the UK version) is a blue spider who tends to be the worrier of the group, and is quite emotional. He is 6 years old.
 Spiderus Reeves (voiced by Tony Jay in the US version and Andy Turvy in the UK version) is a whiny, conniving, and cowardly white spider who lives with his mate Spindella in a crack at the bottom of the Hollow Tree.
 Ned (voiced by Jonathan Wilson) and Ted (voiced by Philip Williams) are a pair of red ant brothers. Ned speaks with an Australian accent and has a tuft of hair between his antenna and Ted speaks with a New York accent. The both of them are scheming and deceptive and have only two main interests: food and getting more of it. A common running gag is that when Ted is mistaken for Ned or vice versa, they would say "I'm Ted. He's Ned." or vice versa.
 Stinky (voiced by Scott McCord in the US version and David Holt in the UK version) is a green stinkbug who takes up detective work in his free time. He speaks with a New York accent and he is also talented at playing the xylophone.
 Felix (voiced by Richard Binsley) is a frog who was introduced in the three-part special "A Froggy Day in Sunny Patch." Felix longed to be a bug himself and refuses to eat bugs, as he does not find them tasty. Instead, he eats only berries.

Recurring
 Betty Beetle (voiced by Patricia Gage in the US version and Maria Darling in the UK version) is Miss Spider's adoptive mother, the kids' maternal grandmother, and Holley's mother-in-law. It's revealed that when Miss Spider couldn't find her real mom, Betty decided to adopt her.
 Uncle Asparagus "Gus" (voiced by Peter Oldring in the US version and David Holt in the UK version) is a red and green beetle who is Miss Spider's adoptive brother, Betty's son, Holley's brother-in-law, and the kids' maternal uncle. He loves to stargaze with his nephews and nieces.
 Shelley (voiced by Cole Caplan) is a snail who is friends with the Spider family. He is also part of the Sunny Patch Bug Scouts.
 Spindella (voiced by Kristina Nicoll in the US version and Lynn Cleckner in the UK version) is Spiderus' wife who he met in the Snakey Woods near the farm. 
 Mandrake (voiced by Samson Weiss-Willis) is Spiderus and Spindella's son.
 Bella (voiced by Emma Pustil) and Ivy (voiced by Nissae Isen) are Spiderus and Spindella's twin daughters.
 Grub (voiced by Rob Tinkler) is a white grub that has told Squirt about the Snakey Woods.
 Whiffy (voiced by Judy Marshak) is a light green stinkbug who is Stinky's sister.
 Grace (voiced by Hanna Endicott-Douglas) is an orphaned ladybug who was adopted by Stinky and Spiffy.
 Lily (voiced by Stephanie Morgenstern) is a grown-up ladybug.
 Snack (voiced by Amanda Soha) is a juvenile ladybug.
 Eunice Earwig (voiced by Cara Pifko) is one of the Spider family's neighbors and the mother of Eddie and Little Sis.
 Eddy Earwig (voiced by Ezra Perlman in the US version and Maria Darling in the UK version) is Eunice Earwig's son and eldest child. He is good friends with Squirt.
 Little Sis (voiced by Tajja Isen) is Eunice's youngest child and Eddie's younger sister.
 Mr. Mantis (voiced by Wayne Robson in the US version and Tom Eastwood in the UK version) is the teacher of the kids' class.
 Beetrice (voiced by Catherine Gallant) is a queen bee in a hive part of the Hollow Tree.

Production and broadcast
The series was first announced on December 17, 2003, as part of a Callaway Arts & Entertainment press release. In January 2004, it was reported that Ontario-based studio Nelvana was animating the show. The series premiered in September 7, 2004 on Teletoon in Canada and on Nickelodeon's Nick Jr. block in the United States.

On June 20, 2005, a second season with 25 episodes was announced for the United States. The second season premiered on March 13, 2006 in the United States, with the episode "Captain Sunny Patch." A third season followed and Treehouse TV finished airing the show's last season on June 17, 2007. The series' final episodes did not air in the United States until 2008 when several episodes which had yet to be broadcast in the country were aired on Noggin. The show aired reruns on Nick Jr. from September 28, 2009 until December 12, 2014. Qubo aired reruns of the show from October 1, 2018 until the channel's discontinuation for three years later on February 26, 2021. In 2020, the show also began to re-run on ZooMoo internationally.

References

External links
 

2000s American animated television series
2000s American children's television series
2004 American television series debuts
2008 American television series endings
2000s British animated television series
2000s British children's television series
2004 British television series debuts
2008 British television series endings
2000s Canadian animated television series
2000s Canadian children's television series
2004 Canadian television series debuts
2008 Canadian television series endings
2000s preschool education television series
American children's animated adventure television series
American children's animated fantasy television series
American television shows based on children's books
American computer-animated television series
American preschool education television series
British children's animated adventure television series
British children's animated fantasy television series
British television shows based on children's books
British computer-animated television series
British preschool education television series
Canadian children's animated adventure television series
Canadian children's animated fantasy television series
Canadian television shows based on children's books
Canadian computer-animated television series
Canadian preschool education television series
Animated preschool education television series
Animated television series about insects
English-language television shows
Television series by MGM Television
Teletoon original programming
Nick Jr. original programming
Channel 5 (British TV channel) original programming